Hale Tegur is a village in Dharwad district of Karnataka, India.

Demographics 
As of the 2011 Census of India there were 245 households in Hale Tegur and a total population of 1,378 consisting of 720 males and 658 females. There were 172 children ages 0-6.

References

Villages in Dharwad district